Universal is the adjective for universe.

Universal may also refer to:

Companies
 NBCUniversal, a media and entertainment company
 Universal Animation Studios, an American Animation studio, and a subsidiary of NBCUniversal
 Universal TV, a television channel owned by NBCUniversal
 Universal Kids, an American current television channel, formerly known as Sprout, owned by NBCUniversal
 Universal Pictures, an American film studio, and a subsidiary of NBCUniversal
 Universal Television, a television division owned by NBCUniversal Content Studios
 Universal Destinations & Experiences, the theme park unit of NBCUniversal
 Universal Airlines (disambiguation)
 Universal Avionics, a manufacturer of flight control components
 Universal Corporation, an American tobacco company
 Universal Display Corporation, a manufacturer of displays
 Universal Edition, a classical music publishing firm, founded in Vienna in 1901
 Universal Entertainment Corporation, a Japanese software producer and video game producer
 Universal Genève, a Swiss watch company
 Universal Gym Equipment
 Universal Helicopters, a commercial helicopter company
 Universal Magazines, an Australian publisher of magazines and websites
 Universal Music Group, a family of record labels
 Universal Music India
 Universal Records (defunct record label), a record label owned by UMG, founded in 1995
 Universal Recording Corporation, a Chicago recording studio founded in 1946
 Universal Records (Philippines), a record label in the Philippines, founded in 1977
 Universal Stereo, a radio station
 Universal Television (Somalia), a Somali television station
 Universal Uclick, an American content syndicate (formed in 2009 merger of Universal Press Syndicate and Uclick)
 Universal Weather and Aviation, an aviation products and services company

Music

Groups
 Universal (group), a 1990s Australian boy band

Albums
 Universal (Borknagar album)
 Universal (Orchestral Manoeuvres in the Dark album), 1996
 Universal (Troll album)
 Universal (U.K. Subs album), 2002
 Universal (YFriday album), 2006

Songs
 "The Universal", a 1995 song by Blur
 "The Universal" (Small Faces song), 1968
 "Universal" (Orchestral Manoeuvres in the Dark song), 1996

Cultural and philosophical concepts 
 Universal (metaphysics)
 Cultural universal, a trait common to all cultures
 Linguistic universal, a statement that applies to all languages

Technology and devices
 HTC Universal, a Pocket PC phone
 The "Universal", an oxygen rebreather designed for use with the Sladen Suit
 Universal slitter, a slitter rewinder for roll slitting

Other uses
 Universal (act), a type of official or legal proclamation
 Universal, Indiana, a small town in the United States
 Universal (Esperantido), a constructed language
 Universal, a Russian nickname for a station wagon car
 U rating (disambiguation), "Universal" media content rating

See also
 El Universal (disambiguation)
 Universal City (disambiguation)
 Universalism (disambiguation)
 Universality (disambiguation)
 Universals (disambiguation)
 Universe (disambiguation)